CHIP (stylized as C.H.I.P.) was a single-board computer crowdfunded by now-defunct Next Thing Co. (NTC), released as open-source hardware running open-source software. It was advertised as "the world's first $9 computer". CHIP and related products are discontinued. NTC has since gone insolvent.

Milestones
Next Thing Co. was an Oakland, California, based start-up company founded in 2013 by Dave Rauchwerk, Gustavo Huber and Thomas Deckert. NTC initially launched CHIP computer via a successful Kickstarter campaign in May 2015.

Next Thing began shipping alpha boards to "Kernel Hacker" backers on September 25, 2015. First customer shipping (for Kickstarter backers) began by May 31, 2016. Pre-order opened by December 2015. Pre-order for the original CHIP had stopped by April 4, 2017, as the line was discontinued.

Next Thing Co. insolvency 
By March 2018, Next Thing Co. had entered insolvency. Many customers still had not received their pre-orders.

Models

CHIP 

CHIP was the original board, mostly targeting hobbyists. The system is built around the Allwinner R8 SoC processor, which integrates an ARM Cortex-A8 CPU (based on ARM architecture V7-A) and peripherals, such as Graphic Engine, UART, SPI, USB ports, CIR, CMOS Sensor Interface and LCD controller. The CPU is also accompanied by a NEON SIMD coprocessor and has RCT JAVA-Accelerations to optimize just-in-time (JIT) and dynamic adaptive compilation (DAC). There is also an ARM Mali-400 GPU, and a H263, H264 and vp8 hardware video decoder in the R8.

CHIP was upgraded in April 2017 in anticipation of the CHIP Pro to "share a large number of the same components".

Features implemented on this model:
 Built-in Wi-Fi 802.11b/g/n, Bluetooth 4.0
 One USB host with type-A receptacle, one USB On-The-Go port
 Composite video and stereo audio port via mini TRRS   
 Optional composite TRRS to RCA audio-video cable
 Optional VGA adapter and HDMI adapter (see Hardware extensions below)
 Open source hardware and open source software
 Up to 45 GPIO ports
 Supports 1-Wire and I2C protocols, PWM output
 Serial console and Ethernet via USB for quick headless operation
 Power options include 5 V via USB OTG, 5 V via CHN pin, and by 3.7 V battery
 Onboard NAND storage, 4-8GB, pre-installed Linux OS (Debian)
 Web-based firmware update

The CHIP is 60 mm × 40 mm in size.

CHIP Pro 
CHIP Pro is similar to the original CHIP board, but uses the newer GR8 version of the chip. It is a system in package (SiP) made by Next Thing Co. It features a 1 GHz Allwinner R8 ARMv7 Cortex-A8 processor with NEON SIMD extensions and a Mali-400 GPU. 256  MB of Nanya Technology DDR3 SDRAM is combined with the R8 SoC into a 14 mm × 14 mm, 0.8 mm-pitch 252-ball FBGA package, simplifying the routing of connections. Instead of having two dual-line 40-pin sockets as on CHIP, it implements castellated edges where the pin holes are designed and optimized to embed to another board with SMT. Most of the CHIP's hardware features are also included in this model.

CHIP "v2" (unreleased)
Few details were available in regard to CHIP's would-be successor or successors except it would have used Next Thing's own SiP GR8 instead of Allwinner's original R8. In addition to feature-sharing with CHIP Pro, the company wanted to "take advantage of CHIP Pro's much more stable supply chain" in order to address the uneasiness in its user base about the future of the product. In responding to user concerns, Next Thing also disclosed that more than one successor product line was in the works.

As Next Thing Co. entered insolvency with its assets and intellectual properties being sold, release of "v2" is improbable.

Hardware extensions 
In addition to open-source hardware and software, Next Thing also published an HPI and an API for users to develop add-ons boards called "DIP"  The company produced several DIPs including the Pocket CHIP.

Pocket CHIP and Pockulus

Pocket CHIP includes a CHIP, a case with a 4.3 inch 480×272 pixel resistive touchscreen, a clicky keyboard, GPIO headers on the top of the device, and GPIO soldering pads inside of the injection molded case. A 5-hour battery is included. Following DIP specifications, the CHIP snaps into the case with no "screws or glues" creating a portable computer. On the lower right corner of the Pocket CHIP is a hexagonal hole that takes a standard #2 HB pencil. Inserting the pencil creates a stand that allows the Pocket CHIP to stand upright on a desk. Likewise, on the lower left is a circular hole for a pen.

PocketCHIP comes loaded with a special edition of CHIP OS that includes the DIP's driver and a couple of additional applications, including a special version of video game console virtual machine PICO-8, a fully functional Linux terminal, a file browser, a terminal based web browser called surf, and modular synthesizer SunVox.

The Pockulus is a virtual reality setup incorporating a Pocket CHIP that requires some 3D printing.

Other DIPs from Next Thing
For users who did not want to use the small screen in Pocket CHIP and also did not want to use the built-in composite TV output, Next Thing sold a VGA DIP and an HDMI DIP. Unlike Pocket CHIP, physical dimensions of these DIPs are similar to CHIP, so the snapped assembly looks like a thicker CHIP.

Media coverage and user community

CHIP received favorable reviews, and constant comparisons to Raspberry Pi. Laura Sydell of NPR asked if the device could "spark a new wave of tinkering and innovation", noting it was also open source hardware. Marco della Cava of USA Today said that the device "represent[s] opportunities to both close the technology gap in developing and developed countries alike, while encouraging children to learn coding, due to their approachable design".

Reviewers also noted its low price. Bo Moore of PC Gamer said the price of CHIP "[puts] Raspberry Pi 2 to shame", and Ian Paul of PCWorld said it made "Raspberry Pi's price seem luxurious". Within days of the launch of its Kickstarter, US national media outlets like The Washington Post and Time followed with glowing coverage. Even Fortune joined the chorus with headline "This $9 computer could change the economics of building hardware."

Since its alpha shipping, CHIP has attracted an enthusiastic user base, communicating mainly on NTC's bulletin board system (BBS). At the time of NTC's demise, the BBS had over 10,000 users, with hundreds of active users and hundreds of postings every month, to a total of over 100,000.

Despite enthusiasm from reviewers and users, Next Thing Co. declared bankruptcy in March 2018, leaving many pre-order customers with undelivered orders.

Archives and continuing support
While NTC has published many of its hardware and software repositories on GitHub, surviving CHIPsters (as CHIP users call themselves ) also launched an effort in order to preserve useful document, software, and other artifacts by leveraging the Internet Archive (a.k.a. archive.org).  One effort is led by a user who has never received his preordered CHIP.  Another user set up a standalone site focusing on binary packages and a Git repository.

In addition, the community also has a Wiki site that is independent of NTC. However, as of 2021, the website ceased to function. The original content is however available in the Internet Archive snapshot from November 2020.

References

External links
C.H.I.P. and C.H.I.P. Pro - The Smarter Way to Build Smart Things Official site (Archived on April 25, 2018, in )
JF Possibilities' NTC mirror jafcobend's standalone archive of binary packages, GIT repos, etc. 
CHIP Community Wiki
Archive of CHIP flash images
Archives of official CHIP BBS

Single-board computers
Linux-based devices
Products introduced in 2015
Kickstarter-funded products